Makhija is an Indian surname. Notable people with the surname include:

Anju Makhija, Indian poet, playwright, and writer
Devashish Makhija, Indian filmmaker, screenwriter, graphic artist, and poet
Manish Makhija, Indian restaurateur and television presenter 
Masumeh Makhija, Canadian actress